Papalau Awele (born 1 March 1995) is a Papua New Guinean footballer who plays as a midfielder for Tusbab Stallions. He made his debut for the national team on March 24, 2016 in their 2–0 loss against the Solomon Islands.

Career
He has played club football with Papua New Guinea top club Hekari United, Madang and Kagua-Erave. At the end of 2019 he moved to Tusbab Stallions, to play for them in the 2019 Papua New Guinea National Soccer League.

References

External links
 

Living people
1995 births
Association football midfielders
Papua New Guinea international footballers
Papua New Guinean footballers
People from the National Capital District (Papua New Guinea)